Aberdeen is an unincorporated community in Lewis County, West Virginia, United States, along Hackers Creek.

References 

Unincorporated communities in Lewis County, West Virginia
Unincorporated communities in West Virginia